In geometry, the order-6 triangular hosohedral honeycomb a regular space-filling tessellation (or honeycomb) with Schläfli symbol {2,3,6}. It has 6 triangular hosohedra {2,3} around each edge. It is a degenerate honeycomb in Euclidean space, but can be seen as a projection onto the sphere. Its vertex figure, a triangular tiling is seen on each hemisphere.

Images
Stereographic projections of central spherical projection, with all edges being projected into circles. Seen below triangular tiling edges are colored into 3 parallel sets for each hemisphere.

Related honeycombs 
This honeycomb can be truncated as t{2,3,6} or {}×{3,6}, Coxeter diagram , seen as one layer of triangular prisms, within a triangular prismatic honeycomb, .

See also 
 Order-7 tetrahedral honeycomb
 List of regular polytopes

References 

 The Beauty of Geometry: Twelve Essays (1999), Dover Publications,  (Chapter 10, Regular Honeycombs in Hyperbolic Space)

Honeycombs (geometry)